Peter D. Hislop is an American mathematician, formerly the Ralph E. and Norma L. Edwards Research Professor (2010 and 2013) and University Research Professor (2004–2005), at the University of Kentucky, and also a published author.

References

Year of birth missing (living people)
Living people
American non-fiction writers
University of Kentucky faculty
20th-century American mathematicians
21st-century American mathematicians